Wudang District is one of 6 urban districts of the prefecture-level city of Guiyang, the capital of Guizhou Province, Southwest China.

Climate

Transportation
Three railway stations are situated in the District:
Guiyang East railway station, one of two major railway stations in Guiyang and an interchange between multiple lines
Luowansanjiang and Baiyi, both intermediate stops on the Guiyang–Kaiyang intercity railway

External links
Guiyang official website, Wudang District

County-level divisions of Guizhou
Guiyang